Marco Edson Gonçalves Dias (born 7 February 1950 in Americana) is a retired divisional general of the Brazilian Army. He is the current head of the Institutional Security Bureau.

Biography
Born in Americana, São Paulo, Dias joined the Army in February 1969 by the Brazilian Army Preparatory School of Cadets (EsPCEx). He attended the Officials Enhancement School (EsAO) in 1986, continuing his graduation at the Brazilian Army Command and General Staff School (ECEME), in 1994. Dias headed the 6th Military Region and commanded the 19th Motorized Infantry Batallion, based in São Leopoldo, between January 1999 and January 2001. He served as military observer at the service of the United Nations in a mission in Central America. Dias is a retired Brazilian Army general, after more than 30 years in this Armed Forces branch. Dias worked in the personal security team of president Luiz Inácio Lula da Silva during his first two terms, between 2003 and 2009. During the presidency of Dilma Rousseff, Gonçalves Dias was head of the Institutional Security Coordination.

In 2012, during his command of the 6th Military Region, Gonçalves Dias was involved in a controversy after meeting with police officers strikers of Bahia, who gave him a birthday cake, ensuring the officer that nothing would happen to them. He was suspended from office and retired months later.

Gonçalves Dias worked with Lula personal security again in 2022. He was part of the transition team for the third Lula administration, as member of the responsible group for strategic intelligence. On 29 December 2022, Gonçalves Dias was announced as head of the Institutional Security Bureau of the third Lula government.

References

|-

1950 births
Living people
People from Americana, São Paulo
Brazilian generals
Government ministers of Brazil